The Irish Free State (Consequential Provisions) Act 1922 (Session 2) was an Act of the Parliament of the United Kingdom passed on 5 December 1922. The Act dealt with a number of matters concerning the Irish Free State, which was established on the day after the Act became law; it also modified the Government of Ireland Act 1920 in relation to Northern Ireland.

Purpose

Prime Minister Bonar Law first introduced the legislation as a Bill in November 1922. The Act's purpose was to deal with a range of consequences arising from the impending creation of the Irish Free State. The Act also had to make provisions for Northern Ireland which would be appropriate depending on whether (i) Northern Ireland decided to remain part of the new Free State after its establishment or (ii) chose to opt back into the United Kingdom (as was widely anticipated). In regard to Northern Ireland, The Times recalled that there was "no doubt" that Northern Ireland would opt to rejoin the United Kingdom. The Act amended the Government of Ireland Act 1920 in certain respects.

Changes

The Act's provisions provided that if Northern Ireland opted out of the Free State:

a Boundary Commission would be established to determine the land frontier between the Free State and the North;
there shall be a Governor of Northern Ireland, with a salary of £8,000;
a Privy Council of Northern Ireland would be established, and there would also be a separate Great Seal;
if there is to be a Council of Ireland (as contemplated in the Government of Ireland Act 1920) "to bring about harmonious action" between the Parliaments and Governments of the South and North and to provide "for the administration of services which the two Parliaments mutually agree should be administered uniformly throughout the whole of Ireland," it will be necessary for identical Acts to be passed;
that the contribution from Northern Ireland towards Imperial liabilities and expenditure is to remain at £7,920,000, subject to periodical adjustment by a Joint Exchequer Board;
the High Court of Appeal for Ireland will cease to exist; and
that Cases which would have been reserved for the High Court of Appeal for Ireland will, in the North, be heard by the Court of Appeal for Northern Ireland.

The Act also:

abolished the office of the  Lord Lieutenant of Ireland which had been an all-Ireland office under the Act of 1920 as with the establishment of the Free State, the representative of the King in the Free State was to be styled the Governor-General of the Irish Free State;
abolished the office of Lord Chancellor of Ireland;
abolished the Irish Land Commissioners (the Commission was revived by the Irish Free State the following year);
provided for the establishment of a trust, called the Irish Sailors and Soldiers Land Trust, for 'the purpose of providing in Ireland cottages, with or without plots or-gardens, for the accommodation of men who served in the naval, military, or air forces during the war. The trust will have five members, of whom three will be appointed by a Secretary of State, one by the President of the Free State, and one by the Prime Minister of Northern Ireland. However, before these provisions could take effect the two Irish Parliaments had to pass legislation to enable the Trust to acquire and hold land;
gave the Commissioners of Customs and Excise powers, if necessary, to make regulations with reference to the importation and exportation of goods into and from Northern Ireland across the land frontier;
made provision as to relief from double income-tax;
made provision for the severance of matters such as the system of national health insurance in Great Britain from that in the Irish Free State would, for example, be made by Order in Council; and
made provision for the pensions of judges.

Great Seal of Northern Ireland

As noted above, the Act was also the instrument that created the Great Seal of Northern Ireland:

There shall be a Great Seal of Northern Ireland which shall be kept by the Governor of Northern Ireland and shall, after the first appointment of such Governor, be used for all matters in Northern Ireland for which the Great Seal of Ireland was theretofore used. Until a Great Seal of Northern Ireland is provided the private seal of the Governor of Northern Ireland may be used as that Great Seal.

Section 6

The Irish Free State (Consequential Adaptation of Enactments) Order 1923 (SR & O 1923/405) was made under this section.

References

1922 in law
1922 in Ireland
United Kingdom Acts of Parliament 1922
December 1922 events
British constitutional laws concerning Ireland
Political history of Ireland
History of Northern Ireland
History of the Republic of Ireland
Acts of the Parliament of the United Kingdom concerning Ireland
Irish Free State
Ireland and the Commonwealth of Nations
Constitutional laws of Northern Ireland
Bonar Law